Vasuvum Saravananum Onna Padichavanga also known by the initialism VSOP, is a 2015 Indian Tamil-language romantic comedy film written and directed by M. Rajesh. It stars Arya, Santhanam Tamannaah and Muktha. Arya produced the film through his studio The Show People, associating with Prasad V Potluri's PVP cinema. The soundtrack was composed by D. Imman. Nirav Shah and Vivek Harshan handled cinematography and editing, respectively.
The film began production in November 2014 and was released on 14 August 2015 to mixed reviews.

Plot 
Vaasu and Saravanan are best friends. When Vaasu's marriage was going to be fixed with Seema, Saravanan wants to first interview Seema to see if she is a suitable bride for Vaasu. A series of comedic incidents happens during the interview and during the marriage of Vasu and Seema, which angers and embarrasses Seema. To make matters worse, Saravanan plays a prank during Vaasu's marriage night, which makes Vaasu end up in hospital with a broken disc.

An angry Seema wants Vaasu to break his friendship with Saravanan and declares that nothing between them until then. Vaasu does not want to break his friendship with Saravanan directly as to not hurt Saravanan's feelings. He gets the help of his friend Gautham, who tells him to get Saravanan married. Vaasu helps Saravanan get a girlfriend in the hopes that the girlfriend will be a reason to end the friendship. Saravanan and Vaasu go to happymarriage.com, where Saravanan falls for Aishwarya Balakrishnan, who works there.

Aishwarya, who initially dislikes Saravanan, eventually agrees to his love. As Saravanan had interviewed Seema before she married Vaasu, Vaasu interviews Aishwarya at a café. A fight breaks out between Aishwarya and Vaasu, forcing Saravanan to choose between the two. Saravanan chooses Aishwarya and breaks his friendship with Vaasu. Vaasu later exits the café dramatically but secretly enjoys outside by dancing.

Vaasu reunites with Seema, but minutes later, Saravanan appears, revealing that he was only lying in front of Aishwarya that he had broken their friendship. Seema feels cheated as Vaasu had promised Seema upon their future child that their friendship was cut. Seema is furious and leaves to her mother's place. Vaasu gets irritated and tells Saravanan to leave and never show his face again.

That night, Gautham tells Vaasu that Saravanan had broken up with Aishwarya for him. Vaasu immediately rushes to see him, and they reunite. They decide to start a club of men who have been cheated by their wives or girlfriends. This turns out to be successful. They are also supported by Akila Chechi, the leader of Akila Indian Men Security Club. Then, Assistant Commissioner Vetrivel arrives and tells the trio to join up with their wives by lying that they have their friendship cut.

Cast 

 Arya as Saravanan
 Tamannaah as Aishwarya Balakrishnan
 Santhanam as Vaasu
 Muktha as Seema
 Karunakaran as Gautham
 Vidyullekha Raman as Kausalya
 Sayaji Shinde as Ashok
 Pattimandram Raja as Balakrishnan
 Siddharth Vipin as Ashwin
 Vennira Aadai Moorthy as Moorthy
 Swaminathan as Point to Point Padmanabhan
 Shakeela as Akila Cheichi 
 Jyothi Lakshmi as Lakshmi
 Renuka as Kamatchi
 Surekha as Ambujam
 Supergood Subramani as Museum Security
 Brindha Das as Sudha
 Heera as Pooja
 Ratheesh Nambiar as Rahul Varma
 C. Ranganathan as Doctor
 Mahanadi Shankar as Police Officer (Cameo)
 Vishal as Assistant Commissioner Vetrivel (Cameo)
 Lakshmi Menon as Lakshmi,Vetrivel's wife (voiceover only)

Production 
In November 2013, Arya agreed to finance and star in the lead role of director M. Rajesh's next venture, with Santhanam also brought in to the project to play a supporting role. Nayanthara was also reported to be a part of the film and an official press statement was released during the same month, stating that filming would begin in late 2014 after Arya had finished his ongoing commitments. In March 2014, Rajesh revealed that it would be a sequel to their successful comedy film Boss Engira Bhaskaran (2010) and that Tamannaah would also play a new character in the franchise. Nayantara later opted out of the film, and Rajesh began re-working the script. In October 2014, Rajesh then announced that the film would not be a sequel to his previous film and that it would be a new script.

A launch event was held on 21 November 2014 and the team began production on the same day, with scenes involving Arya and Tamannaah shot. The cast and crew list was also revealed with Muktha, Karunakaran and Vidyullekha Raman also included in the film. The movie title has been revealed as Vaasuvum Saravananum Onna Padichavanga on 24 November. The logo took on the theme of alcoholic beverages, as the logo was an image of a beer bottle cap and the title itself was a play on its contraction "VSOP", which normally abbreviated to its description of certain types of brandy, "Very Superior Old Pale". It was known that Prasad V Potluri is also producing the film under his banner PVP cinema along with Arya's 'The Show People'.

Music 
D. Imman composed the musical score and soundtrack of this movie. This is his 75th film as music composer. Behindwoods rated 2.5 out of 5 and stated "VSOP is sorta catchy but lacks the Fizz".

Release 
Promoted as Arya's 25th film, the satellite telecast rights were sold to STAR Vijay. The official teaser released on 22 July 2015.

Reception 
Rediff.com gave the film 2 stars out of 5 and wrote that "the offending script make Rajesh's Vaasuvum Saravananum Onna Padichavanga a silly and tasteless film that does not deserve your time." Indiaglitz gave the film 2.5 stars out of 5 and wrote, "This film has many rib tickling, entertaining and engaging moments. But when can we expect an entertainer from Kollywood that does not pass demeaning judgments on women and tease someone for their looks to make others laugh?." The Times of India gave the film 2.5 stars out of 5 and wrote, "What Rajesh has done is [..] taking bits and pieces from his previous successful films and giving us a new film that feels familiar. The only difference is that he manages to succeed... to an extent". India Today rated 1 star and criticised that "Rajesh's two-and-half-hour script has nothing, but female bashing, making fun of plus-sized women, double-meaning-ed, innuendo-ed dialogues and absurd one-liners, which are sweet-coated as humour". Baradwaj Rangan wrote in The Hindu, "With such a premise, and with these overgrown adolescents in every frame, why isn't the film a series of Dumb and Dumber-style physical-comedy sketches? Why the flabby romantic passages, with mood-killing songs during which everyone in the theatre returns to whatever game they were playing on their phones?"

References

External links 
 

2010s Tamil-language films
2015 films
2015 romantic comedy films
Films directed by M. Rajesh
Indian buddy films
Indian romantic comedy films